Streets of Fire is a 1984 American film directed by Walter Hill.

Streets of Fire may also refer to:

 Streets of Fire (Duncan Browne album)
 Streets of Fire (Place Vendome album)
 "Streets of Fire", a song by Bruce Springsteen from Darkness on the Edge of Town
 Streets of Fire (Egyptian film), a 1984 Egyptian film
 "Streets of Fire (Arrow)", twenty-second episode of the second season of Arrow